Jaitpur Shekhpur is a village in the Rewari district in the Haryana state of India. It Is Located on Gurgaon-Rewari Border. Its Pincode Is 122502 . The Village is Dominated By Rao Sahab

References 

Villages in Rewari district